Ust-Morzh is a rural locality (a village) in Vinogradovsky District, Arkhangelsk Oblast, Russia. The population was 49 as of 2010. There are 3 streets.

Geography 
Ust-Morzh is located on the Severnaya Dvina River, 36 km northwest of Bereznik (the district's administrative centre) by road. Khetovo is the nearest rural locality.

References 

Rural localities in Vinogradovsky District